was the pen-name of a Japanese poet and novelist active during the Taishō and Shōwa periods of Japan; he is often known as Kambara Yumei.

Early life
Ariake was born in Tokyo. His father, an ex-samurai from Higo province, was a close associate of Etō Shimpei and active in the Meiji Restoration. His real name was Kambara Hayao. He was so sickly as an infant that his parents waited for a full year to officially register his name with the local government.  He moved to Tokyo together with Ōki Takatō and his mistress, leaving his wife in Higō.

Literary career
While still at middle school, Ariake developed an interest in the works of Byron and Heine, and began writing poetry in a similar style. In 1894, he started a literary journal called Ochibo Zōshi ("Gleaners’Notes") together with Hayashida Shuncho and Yamagishi Kayo, in which he serialized his first novel, . He escaped military conscription during the First Sino-Japanese War as he failed the physical examination.

In 1898, Ariake won first prize in a Yomiuri Shimbun contest with his second novel , which was highly praised by one of the judges, Ozaki Kōyō. However, Ariake gave up prose and decided to concentrate only on poetry for the rest of his literary career.

His first anthology, was published in 1902, and borrowed themes from the ancient Japanese chronicles Kojiki and Fudoki. However, the style of his works exhibited influence from western poets, such as John Keats and Dante Gabriel Rossetti. He followed with a second anthology of lyrical poetry called Dokugen Aika in 1903. In this anthology, he also included Japanese translations of the works of Keats, in which he attempted to follow the rhyming pattern of the original sonnet, but resorting to many archaic and difficult words.

Ariake served as the manager of a popular writer's salon called Ryudōkai, which was started in November 1904, by art critic Iwamura Toru at a French restaurant called Ryudōken in Azabu, Tokyo. Ariake and Iwamura were friends, and Ariake made contact with numerous people in the contemporary literary work, including Kunikida Doppo, Katai Tayama, Shimazaki Tōson, Masamune Hakuchō, through his job as manager of the Ryudōken.

In his fourth anthology, in 1922, he introduced the 14-line sonnet, which was previously seldom used in conventional Japanese modern poetry. Its publication gained him a reputation as a leading figure in Japanese symbolist poetry. However, this came at a time when the literary world was gravitating rapidly towards free verse, and as Ariake refused to adapt to the new trends, he gradually withdrew from literary circles.

In 1947 he published of his autobiographical novel, which was the final poetic work of his career, although he continued to work on translations of European poets as well as literary criticism.

In 1948, Ariake was inducted into the Japan Art Academy.

Ariake moved from Tokyo to Kamakura, Kanagawa prefecture in 1919, but was forced to relocate to Shizuoka city Shizuoka prefecture after his house collapsed during the Great Kantō earthquake of 1923. He returned to Kamakura in 1945, after his house was burned down by the firebombing of Shizuoka during the Pacific War. He continued to live in Kamakura until his death in 1952 of acute pneumonia at the age of 76.

From 1945-1946, the Nobel Prize-winning Kawabata Yasunari was a house-guest at Ariake's house in Kamakura.

Ariake's grave is located at the temple of Kenso-ji in Moto-Azabu, Tokyo.

See also
Japanese literature
List of Japanese authors

References

Further reading
 Kambara, Ariake. Ariake: Poems of Love and Longing by the Women Courtiers of Ancient Japan. Chronicle Books (2000). 
 Okada, Akiko.  Keats And English Romanticism in Japan. Peter Lang (2006). 
 Tu Kuo-ch'ing. Li Chin-fa and Kambara Ariake: The First Symbolist Poets in China and Japan''. Fung Ping Shan Library (1982). ISBN B000H5PAZ8

External links
e-text of Ariake's works at Aozora Bunko (Japanese site)

Japanese poets
19th-century Japanese novelists
20th-century Japanese novelists
1876 births
1952 deaths
People from Tokyo